The 2016 United States House of Representatives elections in Alabama were held on November 8, 2016, to elect the seven U.S. representatives from the state of Alabama, one from each of the state's seven congressional districts. The elections coincided with the 2016 U.S. presidential election, as well as other elections to the House of Representatives, elections to the United States Senate, and various state and local elections. The primaries were held on March 1.

District 1

The incumbent is Republican Bradley Byrne, who has represented the district since 2013. He was re-elected with 68% of the vote in 2014.  The district has a PVI of R+15.

Republican Party
 Bradley Byrne, incumbent U.S. Representative
 Dean Young, businessman and candidate for this seat in 2013

Primary results

General election

Results

District 2

The incumbent is Republican Martha Roby, who has represented the district since 2011. She was re-elected with 67% of the vote in 2014.  The district has a PVI of R+17.

Rob John had filed paperwork with the FEC to run as an Independent.  After Gerritson declared her candidacy John announced that he was suspending his campaign and endorsing her.

Republican Party
 Becky Gerritson, tea party activist
 Martha Roby, incumbent U.S. Representative
 Robert L. "Bob" Rogers

Primary results

Democratic Party
 Nathan Mathis, former State Representative and perennial candidate

General election

Results

District 3

The incumbent is Republican Mike Rogers, who has represented the district since 2003. He was re-elected with 66% of the vote in 2014.  The district has a PVI of R+16.

Republican Party
 Larry DiChiara, former Phenix City Schools Superintendent
 Mike Rogers, incumbent U.S. Representative

Primary results

Democratic Party
 Jesse Smith, candidate for this seat in 2014

General election

Results

District 4

The incumbent is Republican Robert Aderholt, who has represented the district since 1997. He was re-elected unopposed in 2014.  The district has a PVI of R+28.

Republican Party
 Robert Aderholt, incumbent U.S. Representative
 Phil Norris, candidate for AL-07 in 2012

Primary results

General election

Results

District 5

The incumbent is Republican Mo Brooks, who has represented the district since 2011. He was re-elected with 74% of the vote in 2014.  The district has a PVI of R+17.

Republican Party
 Mo Brooks, incumbent U.S. Representative

Democratic Party
 Will Boyd, pastor, former Greenville, Illinois City Councilman and write-in candidate for the United States Senate from Illinois in 2010

General election

Results

District 6

The incumbent is Republican Gary Palmer, who has represented the district since 2015. He was elected with 76% of the vote in 2014.  The district has a PVI of R+28

Republican Party
 Gary Palmer, incumbent U.S. Representative

Democratic Party
 David Putman

General election

Results

District 7

The incumbent is Democrat Terri Sewell, who has represented the district since 2011. She was re-elected without opposition in the general election in 2014.  The district has a PVI of D+20.

Democratic Party
 Terri Sewell, incumbent U.S. Representative

Republican Party
David Van Williams originally qualified to run for this district as a Republican, but was removed from the ballot.

General election

Results

References

External links
U.S. House elections in Alabama, 2016 at Ballotpedia
Campaign contributions at OpenSecrets

Alabama
2016
United States House of Representatives elections